The Battle of Koroncó took place on 13 June 1704 at Koroncó in Moson County, Hungary between the Kurucs (Hungarians) and the army of Habsburg Empire (Germans, Danes, Serbs, Croats). The Kuruc army was defeated in the battle. Although the Austrian army retired to Austria after the battle, the Kuruc positions in the Dunántúl remained uncertain until 1705 because of the fiasco near Koroncó.

Prelude 
General Simon Forgách in May 1704 was broke in the Transdanubia. General Sándor Károlyi won in the battle of Smolenice,  dented the Danish auxiliaries in the battle of Biskupice. In addition the Kuruc forces raided in Austria, Moravia and Styria.

During the operations the Kuruc forces tried to release the Dunántúl and oust the Austrian army from Hungary. Near the Rába and Danube rivers was two army und Forgách and under Károlyi. Károlyi and Forgách sought to unite and join forces to beat the army of Hannibal Heister. Vienna, afraid of a Kuruc invasion and assigned general Heister. But Heister's army on 10 June encamped near Koroncó. Heister feared that run into the trap of Károlyi. But Károlyi did not move to Győr.

Opposing forces

The Kurucs 
Forgách's army was ca. 17–18,000 fighters. The elite corps of the army was 3,000 Veteran Haiduks from the Great Turkish War. Other forces was irregular, untrained and very undisciplined soldiers. Antal Esterházy was the commander of the Kuruc cavalry

Károlyi's army was 4,000 men near Győr, but not received order from general Miklós Bercsényi helped Forgách's army.

The Kuruc army constituted by Hungarians, Slovaks and some Croats (Burgenland Croats).

The Austrians 
Heister's army constituted by the forces of Austria, Holy Roman Empire, Prussia, Denmark, Croatia and the Serbs from Southern-Hungary, ca. 3600–6100 men. The army defended behind the ramparts and Serbian cavalry repulsed the raiding attacks of Kurucs.

The composition of the army:
 473 infantry under von Deutschmeister
 450 infantry under Heister
 465 infantry under colonel Virmond
 144 Prussian infantry under Scipio Bagni
 129 infantry from the Herzogtum Holstein-Plön
 500 Danish infantry from the regiment of the deceased Christian Frederik Haxthausen (d. 1694)
 500 Danish infantry under Colonel Masting
 573 Danish infantry under Colonel Ende
 884 cuirassiers under Georges de La Tour
 800 dragoons under Leopold Schlick
 800 dragoons from Bayreuth
 400 Croatian and Serbian lighthorsemen

The battle 
Heister was the initiator in the battle: on 13 June the Austrian army launch an attack against the Kuruc forces. Forgách with 11,000 men held down the fort, and the remaining 6–7,000 men began the encirclement of the enemy.

The Kurucs routed the Serbian-Croatian cavalry in the skirmisher battle. Esterházy skillfully encircled Heister's army, but the numerical superiority of the Austrian guns keep out the Kuruc forces. The Austrian and Danish infantry fired so fast, and the Hungarian rabble soldiers easily embarrassed, although the retreat of the Serbian auxiliaries was broke the front of Heister's army.

Forgách ordered the final attack against the Austrian cannons, although the Kuruc cavalry was not formed for this attack. The Austrians guns disrupted the Kuruc cavalry. Forgách retreated, the Kuruc army bewildered. Heister launched counter-attack against the Kuruc infantry and scattered the Hungarians.

Aftermath 
Ca. 2000 Kurucs was killed in the battle, the casualties of the Austrian army is 100 killed.

As Heister felt that Vienna is at risk (Károlyi's army was intact), therefore retire in Lower Austria. But Károlyi not marched into Austria. On 4 July Károlyi's army with the Hungarian Slovenes triumphed near Szentgotthárd over the Styrian army, nevertheless the Kurucs were unable to hold the Transdanubia.

The battle of Koroncó proved that the disorganized army unable to win a great open battle against the regular imperial army.

János Bottyán in 1705 permanently liberated the Transdanubia and in the second battle of Szentgotthárd triumphed over Heister.

Sources 
 Bánlaky József: A magyar nemzet hadtörténete – A koroncói csata 1704. június 13-án

Literature 
 Magyarország hadtörténete, Zrínyi katonai kiadó, Budapest 1985. szerk.: Liptai Ervin 

Battles involving Hungary
Battles involving the Holy Roman Empire
Battles involving Austria
Battles involving Denmark
Battles involving Prussia
Battles involving Croatia
1704 in the Habsburg monarchy
18th century in Hungary
Conflicts in 1704
Rákóczi's War of Independence